High master is the term used, in place of the more conventional "headmaster",  "head teacher" or "principal", to denote the head teachers of two English independent schools: Manchester Grammar School and St Paul's School in London. The incumbent high masters of Manchester Grammar School and St. Paul's School are Dr. Martin A Boulton and Ms. Sally-Anne Huang respectively.

The equivalent high mistress is used for female headteachers at some independent schools, including St Paul's Girls' School and Abercorn School.

References

Education and training occupations